

Events
In a prelude to the Castellammarese War in New York City, New York mob boss Joe Masseria attempts to mediate a dispute between Chicago gangsters Al Capone and Joe Aiello. However, Aiello ignores Masseria's peacemaking and later threatens him for interfering. Masseria then goes to Aiello's main supporter, Detroit mobster Gaspar Milazzo, to get his support in ending the Chicago gang war. However, Milazzo refuses to help and is supported by a faction of the Brooklyn Castellamarese organization, led by Nicolo Schirò, and Buffalo mobster Stefano Magaddino's organization.  Their actions precipitate a general split among American mafiosi and convince Masseria that these mobsters are plotting against him.
New York gangster Charles Luciano, representing the "Young Turks" faction (which included mobsters such as Vito Genovese and Frank Costello), and Ciro Terranova begins secretly negotiating with Salvatore Maranzano to persuade him to declare independence from Joe Masseria.
Brooklyn mobster Joe Parrino is killed by members of the Castellammarese organization. Following his death, control of the Brooklyn Castellammarese is turned over to Sicilian boss Salvatore Maranzano by Buffalo, New York mob boss Stefano Magaddino.
Chicago and New York police detectives establish a connection between the weapons used in the St. Valentine's Day Massacre and the murder of New York mobster Frankie Yale, implicating Chicago boss Al Capone in Yale's death.
The US Federal Bureau of Narcotics replaces the Narcotics Division of the Prohibition Unit.
Murder, Inc. gunman George Defeo is killed in New York by the Shapiro Brothers.
Benjamin Bennett, a New York mobster brought to Chicago by George "Bugs" Moran as muscle for the North Side Gang, disappears shortly after his arrival.

Timeline
January – Brooklyn mobster Cola Schirò disappears after being forced to pay $10,000 to Joe Masseria.  After Schiro's disappearance, Joe Parrino succeeds Schiro as leader of the Brooklyn Castellammarese faction.
January 5 – Ciro Terranova issues a press statement regarding the dramatic robbery at the Judge Albert Vitale Fundraiser dinner in New York in December 1929.  Terranova claims that he is being used as a scapegoat for the split in the New York Tammany Hall political organization.  He also claims to be a "man of peace" and asks to be left alone.
February 4 – Chicago gangster Julius Rosenheim is killed shortly after agreeing to become a police informant.
February 20 – Carlo T. Piranio, founder of the Dallas crime family, dies of natural causes. His organization is taken over by his brother, Joseph T. Piranio.
February 26 – Bronx mobster Tom Reina is killed by a shotgun blast by mobster Vito Genovese while leaving his aunt's home.  Reina is later replaced by Joe Pinzolo. Reina, an ally of Masseria, had been suspected of secretly negotiating to defect to Maranzano's organization before his death.
March 14 – The New York State Appellate Court orders the removal of Magistrate Albert Vitale due to his ties to organized crime figures such as Ciro Terranova and Arnold Rothstein and an unexplainable $10,000 deposit to his bank account.
March 17 – Released from prison in Philadelphia, Al Capone returns to Chicago to resume his war against mobster Joe Aiello.
April – Raymond "Craneneck" Nugent Bank robber and killer with the Egan's Rats gang of St Louis "Vanished" in Florida.
April – Detroit bootlegger Joseph Galbo is convicted of bribery (April 8) and sentenced to 15 months in federal prison (April 14).
April 13 – Clinton G. Price, district attorney of Juneau County, Wisconsin and political figure within Milwaukee, is severely wounded by a shotgun blast at his home. Price dies the following morning.
May 6- Mob boss Tony Buccola "Disappears" after alleged confrontation with organized Crime Figures {Joseph Ardizzone}. The only trace of him is his car found in Venice California. Allgedly  Buccola claimed to have information in the disappearance of Frank Baumgartker who vanished November 25, 1929.
May 31 – Gaspar Milazzo of the Detroit crime family, is shot and killed while walking through a Detroit fish market.
June 1 – Fox Lake Massacre, Fox Lake Illinois Verne Miller killed three and wounded two men in revenge for disappearance/death of his friend Eugene "Red" McLaughlin in May 1930 by Al Capone gang. {McLaughlin body found in Chicago canal}
June 9 – Chicago Tribune journalist Alfred Lingle is shot and killed in a train station in Chicago, Illinois. The Chicago newspapers would promise a $55,000 reward for information on the murderer. It would be rumored that Lingle had extensive connections to organized crime.
June 30 – Thomas Somneiro, a Chicago Outfit lieutenant, is found dead in Chicago's West Side. He was strangled to death.
July 5 – Cleveland, Ohio mobster Joe Porrello is killed, along with his bodyguard Sam Tilocco, by an unidentified gunman while dining at a restaurant owned by mobster Frank Milano. Milano would succeed Porrello as leader of the Cleveland syndicate.
July 15 – Vito Bonventre, Underboss to Nicolo Schiro, is gunned down outside his garage in Brooklyn.
July 31 – Thomas McNichols and James "Bozo" Schupe, two smalltime bootleggers, shoot each other to death on Madison Street in Chicago.
August 15 – Peter "The Clutching Hand" Morello, consiglierie to Joe Masseria, and his bodyguard Giuseppe Piranio are killed by gunmen employed by rival boss Salvatore Maranzano.  The gunmen possibly include the mysterious mobster known only as Buster from Chicago.
September – Forming a secret alliance with the remnants of deceased mobster Tom Reina's organization, Salvatore Maranzano arranges to have Joe Pinzolo, the new Reina family boss, killed in early September. Pinzolo would be killed by Bobby Doyle outside the offices of the Lucchese crime family.  The hit is reportedly planned by Lucchese bosses Tommy Lucchese and Tommaso Gagliano.
September 5 – Tommy Lucchese is arrested for the murder of Joe Pinzolo. However, charges are later dropped due to lack of evidence.
September 23 – Al Capone rival and Unione Siciliane President Joe Aiello is killed in a drive-by shooting outside a friend's home. Aiello's death eliminates a major threat to the Chicago Outfit. Agostino Loverdo is placed by Capone as head of the Union Siciliane. However, the organization's value greatly declines over the decade, quietly dissolving by the late 1930s.
November 5 – Mobsters Steve Ferrigno and Alfred Mineo, allies of Joe Masseria, are killed by Salvatore Maranzano's gunman outside Ferrigno's home in New York. Masseria narrowly avoids the ambush himself.

Arts and literature
Doorway to Hell (film) starring Lew Ayres and James Cagney.

Births
May 30 – Corrado Carnevale, Sicilian High Court judge and mafia associate
November 16 – Salvatore Riina "Toto", Sicilian mafia boss
December – James Torello "Turk", Chicago Outfit member and involved in loansharking

Deaths
Ike Bloom [Isaac Gittelson], Jim Colosio lieutenant
George Defeo, Murder, Inc. member
George Maloney, Chicago gangster and co-leader of a bootlegging gang with Michael "Bubs" Quinlan
Joe Parrino, New York mobster
February 4 – Julius Rosenheim, Chicago gangster and police informant
February 20 – Carlo T. Piranio, founder of the Dallas crime family
February 26 – Tom Reina, New York mobster
April – Raymond "Craneneck" Nugent Bank robber and killer "Vanished" in Florida.
April 13 – Clinton G. Price, Wisconsin District Attorney and political figure
May 6 – Crime boss Tony Buccola "vanishment"
May 31 – Gaspar Milazzo, former New York mobster and now leader of the Detroit crime family
June 9 – Alfred Lingle, journalist
June 30 – Thomas Somneiro, Chicago Outfit lieutenant
July 5 – Joseph Porrello, Cleveland mobster
July 31 – Thomas McNichols, Chicago bootlegger
July 31 – James Schupe "Bozo", Chicago bootlegger
August 15 – Peter Morello, "The Clutching Hand", Masseria consigliere and former leader of the Morello crime family
September 5 – Joe Pinzolo, New York mobster
September 23 – Joe Aiello, Chicago mobster and president of the Unione Siciliane.
November 5 – Steve Ferrigno, New York mobster
November 5 – Alfred Mineo, New York mobster

Years in organized crime
Organized crime